Bertrand Pernot du Breuil (3 November 1926 – 24 March 2011) was a French equestrian. He competed in two events at the 1952 Summer Olympics.

References

1926 births
2011 deaths
French male equestrians
Olympic equestrians of France
Equestrians at the 1952 Summer Olympics
People from Saumur
20th-century French people